The 2019–20 Indigo Group Premiership was the first season of the new format of the Welsh Premiership, the top tier of club rugby in Wales run by the Welsh Rugby Union. It was be contested by twelve Welsh clubs following a reduction from sixteen teams at the end of the 2018–19 season.

The season was cancelled on 20 March 2020 due to the COVID-19 pandemic.

Structure 
The structure is a traditional league. Each team will play each other team on a home and away basis for a total of 22 games. League points are awarded as such – 4 points for a win, 2 for a draw and 0 for a loss. Teams can also earn an additional bonus point by scoring four or more tries in a match and/or losing by less than seven points. One team will be relegated to the Welsh Championship at the end of the season, provided that the Welsh Championship winners meet the criteria for an A Licence. The top 6 teams from the previous 2018–19 season will play against teams from the new Scottish Super 6 league in a cross-border competition in April and May 2020.

Teams 
The top 12 teams that competed in the previous season will take part again this season. Merthyr are the reigning champions and are aiming to win the league for the fourth year in succession.

Standings

References

External links 
 

Welsh Premier Division seasons
Premiership
Wales
Indigo Group Premiership